Kimberly J. Ng (born November 17, 1968) is an American executive in Major League Baseball. She is currently the general manager of the Miami Marlins and the highest-ranking female baseball executive. She is the first woman to serve as general manager of a team in the Big Four leagues in North America and the first person of East Asian descent to serve as general manager of an MLB team.

A graduate of the University of Chicago, Ng played college softball.  She then worked her way up in the front office of several Major League Baseball teams and became a vice president of the league.  She was named the Marlins' general manager in 2020.

Early life
Ng was born in Indianapolis, Indiana, the first of five daughters, to Virginia (née Fong) and Jin Ng.  Her father, an American of Cantonese Chinese descent, was a financial analyst, and her mother, Thailand-born of Chinese descent, was a banker. She attended elementary school in Fresh Meadows, Queens and junior high on Long Island, New York. Her interest in baseball started when she played stickball on the street in Queens and her father taught her about sports. She played tennis and softball at Ridgewood High School in Ridgewood, New Jersey and graduated in 1986. She graduated from the University of Chicago in 1990, where she played softball for four years and was named MVP infielder, and earned a B.A. in public policy. During her senior year at University of Chicago, she served as president of the university's Women's Athletic Association.

Career

Ng began her career as an intern with the Chicago White Sox after graduating from the University of Chicago and her first project was to conduct research on Rule 5 draftees which took advantage of Ng's love of statistics and analyzing scouting reports. She was hired full-time in 1991 and became special projects analyst before being promoted to Assistant Director of Baseball Operations under then-GM Ron Schueler in 1995. In 1995 she became the youngest person, and the first woman, to present a salary arbitration case in the major leagues when she worked for the White Sox, regarding the case of pitcher Alex Fernandez, and won. Prompted by a desire to expand her networks and learn how executives from other clubs conducted business, Ng then worked in the offices of the American League in 1997, where she was Director of Waivers and Records, approving all transactions.

In March 1998, she was recruited by general manager Brian Cashman to work for the New York Yankees as assistant general manager, becoming the youngest in the major leagues, at age 29, and the second woman ever to hold the position behind only Elaine Weddington Steward, who, in 1990, became the assistant general manager of the Boston Red Sox She joined the Los Angeles Dodgers as vice president and assistant general manager in 2001.

In 2005, Ng was interviewed for the vacant position of Dodgers general manager. No female had ever been a GM in any major sport. The Dodgers hired Ned Colletti as their GM, who immediately kept Ng on as his assistant. Between 2005 and 2020, Ng interviewed for the general manager position with at least five teams, including the Seattle Mariners, San Diego Padres, Anaheim Angels, and San Francisco Giants. On March 8, 2011, Ng announced that she was leaving the Dodgers to take on the position of senior vice president of baseball operations for Major League Baseball, where she would report to former Yankees and Dodgers manager Joe Torre.

Marlins general manager

On November 13, 2020, Ng was hired as general manager of the Miami Marlins. She became the first woman to become a general manager of a men's team in the history of major North American sports, as well as the first female Asian-American and first East Asian-American general manager in MLB history. Upon being unveiled as the new Marlins' general manager, Ng received congratulatory messages from figures such as Michelle Obama, Billie Jean King, and Martina Navratilova.

Awards
In 2014, Bleacher Report included Ng on its list of the 25 Most Powerful Women in Sports. In 2015, Forbes ranked Ng #13 on its list of the most influential minorities in sports and #5 on its list of the most powerful women in sports. In 2017, Adweek named Ng one of the most powerful women in sports.

Ng was selected for the inaugural 2021 Forbes 50 Over 50; made up of entrepreneurs, leaders, scientists and creators who are over the age of 50.

Personal life
Ng is married to Tony Markward, co-owner of Silas Wines in Oregon.

See also
 Women in baseball

References

1968 births
American people of Thai descent
American sportswomen
American sportspeople of Chinese descent
Chicago White Sox executives
Living people
Los Angeles Dodgers executives
Major League Baseball central office executives
Major League Baseball general managers
Miami Marlins executives
New York Yankees executives
People from Long Island
People from Queens, New York
People from Ridgewood, New Jersey
Ridgewood High School (New Jersey) alumni
Sportspeople from Indianapolis
Sportspeople from Bergen County, New Jersey
Sportspeople from New York City
Women in American professional sports management
Chicago Maroons softball players
Businesspeople from Indianapolis
Women baseball executives
Asia Game Changer Award winners